Crabtree–Blackwell Farm is a historic farm located near Blackwell, Washington County, Virginia. The main house is a "saddlebag" type building with 2 1/2-story pens connected by a central limestone rubble chimney stack.  The remaining Appalachian vernacular contributing resources are a spring house or milkhouse and log hay barn.  The farm is representative of mountain folk culture.

It was listed on the National Register of Historic Places in 1975.

References

Farms on the National Register of Historic Places in Virginia
Buildings and structures in Washington County, Virginia
National Register of Historic Places in Washington County, Virginia